Ue with acute (Ү́ ү́; italics: Ү́ ү́) is a letter of the Cyrillic script.

Ue with acute is sometimes used in the Mongolian language. It is romanized as “Ý” in Mongolian. 

Ue with acute was used in the Old Tajik alphabet. It  corresponds to digraph Оъ.

Ue with acute was used in the Cyrillization of Japanese.

See also
Cyrillic characters in Unicode
Ý ý - Latin letter Y with acute accent
Ű ű - Latin letter U with
double acute accent - a Hungarian letter
Ӳ ӳ - U with
double acute accent (Cyrillic)

Cyrillic letters with diacritics